Somerset High School is a public high school in Somerset, Kentucky, United States.

Somerset High School, with a student population of 509, is a comprehensive high school. Students may choose among four diploma programs including the standard, academic, college preparatory, and commonwealth diplomas. Students who need to make up high school credits may attend the "Wright Steps Academy", and students have access to the district alternative program. Students may also participate in a wide range of extracurricular classes and activities including band and working in the "Jumper Security" school bank. There are clubs including the National Honor Society and the Fellowship of Christian Athletes. Somerset High School has produced one United States Senator (Senator John Sherman Cooper) and several athletes who have played at the college and professional levels.

Extracurricular activities available at Somerset High School include Academic Team, Quick Recall, Future Problem Solving, Yearbook, National Honor Society, Football, Baseball, Archery, Cheerleading, Cross-Country, Basketball, Marching Band, Swimming, Golf, Tennis, Track, Softball, Soccer, E-Team, (Environmental, Energy, Education Team), DECA, FBLA, Police and Medical Explorers, Student Technology Leadership Program, Culture Club, Drama, the Young Filmmaker's Guild and the Pep Club. These are available to all students.

Athletics
Somerset was one of the first schools in the state of Kentucky to field a football program, beginning play in 1907. The Briar Jumpers are one of the most successful programs in the state and a perennial  small-school powerhouse. The school won numerous state and Southern titles, prior to the formation of KHSAA football, and a national championship in 1916.  The school ranks among the top-10 in all-time wins in the state, toppling over 700 wins as of 2019. The Jumpers have won 21 district titles, 17 regional titles, 5 KHSAA state runner-ups: 1978, 1981, 1983, 1988, 2009 and one KHSAA state championship: 2019. The program has featured numerous high school and college all-Americans and members of the college football hall of fame.

Somerset has one state title in baseball, earned in 1974.

Footnotes

References

Educational institutions established in 1888
1888 establishments in Kentucky
Public high schools in Kentucky
Schools in Pulaski County, Kentucky
Somerset, Kentucky